Town Hall Square may refer to:

Austria
 Rathausplatz, Vienna

Canada
 Yorkville Town Hall Square, Toronto

Denmark
 City Hall Square, Copenhagen

Estonia
 Raekoja plats, Tallinn
 Raekoja plats, Tartu

Lithuania
 Kaunas Town Hall Square
 Town Hall Square of Vilnius

Norway
 Rådhusplassen, in Oslo

See also
 Town Hall Square Historic District, Sandwich, Massachusetts
 Town Hall and the square
 City Hall Square (disambiguation)